Sharyn Maceren is an American pop/R&B singer and songwriter. She first rose to prominence in August 2002 with her album Always Dreamin. It included the singles "Hard To Get", "A Little More Time", and "In Just One Night". She reappeared in 2007 with her all-new album Nighttime Land. It spawned singles "Can U Wait", "Sweet Nothings", and "U Love Me Good". Sharyn then released a karaoke version of Nighttime Land in 2008. It had all of the original tracks, but in karaoke version. In 2012, she released her third studio album Sunkissed.  It gave rise to the single "In the Sunlight", which includes a Sir Elegance remix.  Sharyn is most notable for writing her own songs and doing the artwork  on her albums.

As a teenager, she had previously recorded as the S Factor.  During this period, her maxi-single "Hard to Get" reached the 32nd spot on Billboard's Hot Dance Music Maxi-Single chart.

Discography

Albums
Always Dreamin (2002)
Nighttime Land (2007)
Karaoke: Nighttime Land (2008)
Sunkissed (2012)
The One (2018)

Compilation albums
Dreams Remixed (2004)
Before Bedtime: Unreleased Demo's from the Sharyn Maceren Archive (2006)
11:11 (2021)

Singles
"Hard to Get" (The S-Factor) (1996)
"One & One" (1999)
"When the Record Spins/ Rainbow" (2002)
"In Just One Night" (2002)
A Little More Time - EP (2002)
"Can U Wait/Delicious" - promo (2007)
"Can U Wait" (2007)
"Sweet Nothings" (2008)
"Christmas Kiss/ Wishlist" - promo (2009)
"In the Sunlight" (2012)
"Endless Summer" (2012)
"He" - promo (2012)
"Livin' the Good Life" (2013)
"All I Want" DJ Pickee Rx (2014)
"Famous" (2014)
"Feels Like Heaven" (2018)
"Remember the Days" (2018)
"If I Can See You... Again" (2018)
"Love Is Where You Are" (2019)
"The One" (2019)
"Tears I Cry" (2019)
"Love Flows" (2019)
"Reverse" (2019)
"Party" (2019)
"Spark" ft. Dark Intensity (2019)
"Take Me to Ibiza" (2019)

Other releases
"Back 2 Vegas" ft. Sir Elegance
"Glamorous Life" ft. Hyberspace (2013)
"Everybody" ft. Hyberspace (2013)
"Don't Ever Leave" ft. Hyberspace (2013)

References

External links
Sharyn Maceren's homepage
Sharyn Maceren's YouTube Channel

American women singers
Living people
American musicians of Filipino descent
American freestyle musicians
Filipino freestyle musicians
Year of birth missing (living people)